Doris Malkin Curtis (January 12, 1914 – May 26, 1991) was an American paleontologist, stratigrapher, and geologist. She became the first woman president of the Geological Society of America (1991) and made meaningful contributions towards Scripps Institution of Oceanography.

Biography 
Doris Malkin Curtis was born in Brooklyn, New York, on January 12, 1914. Both her mother, Mary Berkowitz, and father, Meyer Malkin, inspired Doris from a young age to pursue excellence in all areas of life. Curtis enjoyed involving herself in clubs and the community, and this has been a well-known trait of hers, since her Elementary school days. In her early years, Curtis had a significant involvement with Girl Scouts and she became increasingly involved both as a member and leader. She eventually assumed the position of counsellor, acting as a role model for young women. She attended Erasmus Hall High School in Brooklyn, where she demonstrated a variety of interests. During her post-secondary academic years, she attended Brooklyn College, where she received her bachelor's degree in Geology in 1933, and went on to earn her master's degree in 1934 and PhD in 1949 at Columbia University. While completing her PhD she did her research in micropaleontology. 

Curtis had a lengthy career in the petroleum industry working for the Shell Oil Company from 1942 until 1979. In 1959, at Shell she was promoted to the position of senior geologist. She then began her career in academia, where she taught for nearly 5 years. Curtis also taught at Houston's Rice University for a few years. Ultimately, her passion for the petroleum industry reunited her with Shell Oil, where she continued to work until 1979. During these years, an energy crisis caused the urgent need for further oil exploration. She then formed a geology consulting firm with her long time friend/partner Dorothy Jung Echols. Doris continued to work until her death on May 26, 1991 (age 77). She died from pneumonia in Houston at the M.D Anderson Cancer Research Institute – where her career began. In August later that year, her life was celebrated by the staff of the Geological Society of America as her ashes were placed beneath the branches of a spruce tree, which represented the ever-growing impact she made on those she came across.

At a very young age, Curtis excelled in the geological field to pursue her interests further. Furthermore, in 1990, she was the first to become a woman president of an organization called “The Geological Society of America,” which consisted of roughly 17,000 members. Doris Malkin Curtis was an explorer in her field, working within the gulf coast for over 50 years and making contributions throughout her career. Despite the many adversities she faced with her illness, she was able to overcome her problems and lead a diverse group of people. Even during her battle with acute leukemia, she continued to travel as the GSA president, demonstrating the same strength and perseverance that she was known for.

Career 
She began her career by working in the petroleum industry with small independent companies in 1939, she wanted to be able to measure various depths of the earth and study the characteristics of multiple subsurfaces. In 1941, Doris began working for the Shell Oil Company. Initially as a paleontologist until she was transferred to several different locations to work as a stratigrapher and geologist (1942-1950). As a member of the Houston Geological Society, she participated in the construction of “technical papers,” for the Gulf Coast Section.  With the help of her mother, she also completed her field work required to complete her PhD during this time.   

After marrying a Shell engineer, temporarily ending her career at Shell due to nepotism laws at the time as well as gender discrimination, Curtis joined the University of Houston as a Faculty of Earth Sciences member. After teaching for two years, she left to become an associate research geologist for Scripps Institution of Oceanography where she made contributions to the study of biofacies. Doris began teaching at university as an instructor for sedimentary geology, beginning at the University of Oklahoma (1954-1959) where she became a popular professor and instructor, loved among students. Although it was strange for a woman to have a senior position in the field of geology during this time, her passion and talent contributed to the high quality education she provided to her students.  

In 1960, she began working in the petroleum field once more and was assigned to Shell's Baton Rouge Exploration Office. Curtis was adamant on many social justice issues, she was a member of the League of Women Voters which eventually earned her the position of president.  Doris was also a member and leader of the Environmental Quality Committee, she addressed how the company could limit their pollution and impact on the environment.  After working alongside Shell for nineteen more years, Doris retired in 1979 at the age of 65 – after years of hard work and determination. She created a geological consulting firm with her good friend, Dorothy Jung Echols by the name of 'Curtis and Echols.' This opportunity allowed her skills to aid in the mapping of  deposition in various locations to determine where hydrocarbons could be found within the earth. Doris was a very respected geologist, she held many sessions of various geology topics. During her time as a geologist she has produced and contributed to over thirty papers on numerous topics in the geological field.  Thanks to Doris' contribution to the geological field, new concepts for interpreting the geology of basins all around the world were created and the study of time-synchronous deltas was initiated in Louisiana, which was later published in the SEPM.

Recent years 
An award was named after Doris Malkin Curtis in 2007 – The Doris Malkin Curtis Medal. This award was created to acknowledge multiple contributions to the field of geology in the Gulf of Mexico along with other contributions globally – specifically on the topic of basins. In honour of Curtis' contributions and accomplishments in the field of geology for 50 years.

Accomplishments 
 Doris published over 30 papers that were featured in professional journals on topics such as biostratigraphy and the source of hydrocarbons in the Gulf of Mexico during the Cenozoic period.
 She was a member of multiple geologic organization's such including being an honorary member and president of the Gulf section of SEPM, the Association of Geologists for International Development (AGID), the International Association of Sedimentologists, the American Institute of Professional Geologists (AIPG) - where she was on the executive committee, the American Association for the Advancement of Science (AAAS), the American Association of Petroleum Geologists (AAPG), the Houston Geological Society, Sigma Xi, a member of the board for the Treatise on Petroleum Geology, the 28th International Geological Congress, and the Scientific Committee of the International Geological Correlation Programme of the International Union of Geological Sciences.
 The first woman to become president of the Geological Society of America (GSA).
Curtis was invited to the Indiana University to speak, she was one of many of the accomplished women talked about during Women's History Month.
The first woman to become the President of The American Geological Institute.
 With her background in geology and industry, she became a member of the Environmental Quality Committee and worked towards conservation of the environments that industries are founded on and led her to be appointed in 1967 as one of four delegates from the United States to the USSR in an exchange visit to tour petroleum provinces in the Baku area of the Caspian Sea.  
 The accomplishment she was most proud of was her opportunity to participate in the shipboard sedimentologist on two legs of the Deep Sea Drilling Project on the Glomar Challenger in Yokohama to Okinawa Japan from 1978 to 1979 and again in 1983. Doris felt that the experience was comparable to a "trip to the moon."
 Doris was listed in the book American Men and Women of Science and Marquis Who's Who due to her contributions to geology. 
 Received Matrix award in Houston for Women in Community Service. 
 Member and chairman of the U.S National Committee of Geology.
 The Doris Malkin Curtis medal is awarded to individuals in geology who have made considerable contributions in understanding of the geology of the Gulf coast. 
 The Curtis-Hedberg petroleum career achievement award is a new award that is meant to honour the two former presidents of GSA (Geological Society of America), Doris Malkin Curtis and Hollis Hedberg, this award is given to those who have made significant contributions to the discovery of petroleum reserves.
 Doris M. Curtis Outstanding Women in Science Award, this is awarded to women who have made great impacts on geoscience with their PHD research.
 Coauthored the novel "How to Try to Find an Oil Field" in 1981 with Patricia Wood Dickerson, and Donald M Gray.
Became the president of the “Society of Economic Paleontologists and Mineralogists.”
Curtis was the first woman to contribute to “Distinguished Lecturer for the American Association of Petroleum Geologists,” in which she went on to become one of the two women who were “honourary members.”

See also
 Timeline of women in science

References 

1914 births
1991 deaths
American paleontologists
20th-century American geologists
Brooklyn College alumni
Columbia University alumni
People from Brooklyn
Erasmus Hall High School alumni
Scientists from New York (state)
Presidents of the Geological Society of America
Women paleontologists